Lahmacun ( pronounced lahmajoun) or Lahmajo is a flatbread topped with minced meat (most commonly beef or lamb), minced vegetables, and herbs including onions, garlic, tomatoes, red peppers, and parsley, flavored with spices such as chili pepper and paprika, then baked. Lahmacun is often wrapped around vegetables, including pickles, tomatoes, peppers, onions, lettuce, parsley, and roasted eggplant.

Due to its shape and superficial similarity, it is sometimes described as Armenian pizza, Turkish pizza, or similar names. However, unlike pizza, lahmacun is not usually prepared with cheese and the crust is thinner.

Lahmacun is a popular dish in Armenia, Turkey, Iraq, Lebanon, Syria, Palestine (lahm bi 'ajin), and Arab communities worldwide. In Lebanon and Syria it is also known as sfiha. It is also made by Pontic Greeks and Cappadocian Greeks as these populations inhabited parts of the Ottoman Empire until the population exchange between Greece and Turkey in 1923, and the dish can now be found in specific restaurants across Greece.

Etymology and terminology 
The Turkish word is pronounced like "lah-ma-joun". The dish is also called sfiha Armanniye in Arabic, translating roughly to Armenian Flatbread, and alluding to an Armenian variant.

History 
Flatbreads in the Middle East have been cooked in tandoors and on metal frying pans such as the tava for thousands of years. They have been used to wrap meat and other foods for convenience and portability. However, until the wider adoption in medieval times of the large stone ovens, flatbreads stuffed or topped with meat or other foods were not baked together, cooking the bread and the topping at the same time. A variety of such dishes, such as sfiha and manakish, became popular in countries formerly parts of the Ottoman Empire, especially Turkey, Armenia, Syria, Lebanon, and Iraq. A thin flatbread, topped with spiced ground meat, became known as lahm b'ajin (meat with dough), shortened to lahmajin and similar names.

According to Ayfer Bartu, lahmacun was not known in Istanbul until the mid-20th century. Bartu says that before the dish became widespread in Turkey after the 1950s, it was found in Arab countries and the southern regions of Turkey, around Urfa and Gaziantep.

Food wars 
Due to the hostile nature of the relations between Armenia and Turkey, the opening of Armenian restaurants serving the food in Russia was met by some protests.

In March 2020, Kim Kardashian, an American model of Armenian heritage, posted a video on her Instagram saying "Who knows about lahmacun? This is our Armenian pizza. My dad would always put string cheese on it and then put it in the oven and get it really crispy." This sparked outrage among Turkish social media users and had lashed out at her for describing lahmacun as Armenian pizza.

References 

Arab cuisine
Flatbread dishes
Assyrian cuisine
Armenian cuisine
Greek cuisine
Israeli cuisine
Iraqi cuisine
Lebanese cuisine
Levantine cuisine
Syrian cuisine
Turkish cuisine